Richard Piper (born 22 October 1947) is a British former racing driver.

Piper drove in the British Formula Atlantic championship from 1979 to 1981. He raced part-time in the World Sportscar Championship from 1985 to 1992, then drove in the 24 Hours of Le Mans in 1993 and 1994. He drove in the Historic Formula One Championship in 2008 and drove a vintage Theodore Racing Formula One car in historic events in 2010 after driving a Lola T332 Formula 5000 car in 2009.

24 Hours of Le Mans results

References

1947 births
Living people
British racing drivers
24 Hours of Le Mans drivers
IMSA GT Championship drivers
World Sportscar Championship drivers